Osram Opto Semiconductors GmbH of Regensburg, Germany, was a wholly owned subsidiary of Osram GmbH, which was the world's second largest manufacturer of optoelectronic semiconductors after Nichia and followed in third place by Cree Inc. The company was founded in 1999 as a joint venture between Osram and Infineon Technologies. In 2021 Osram Opto Semiconductors was integrated to AMS-Osram International GmbH and is now part of the AMS Osram Group.

The main products of the company are light-emitting diodes (LEDs) as well as high power laser diodes, infrared components and optical sensors.

History
When Siemens split off the semiconductor operations to form a separate legal entity, Osram had an opportunity to take over the LED division.

On January 1, 1999 the takeover was completed with a 51% majority share. The Siemens subsidiary, Infineon, initially retained a 49% share. In the summer of 2001, Osram acquired all Infineon shares in the sale of opto-semiconductors.

In 2003, the company opened an opto-chip factory in Regensburg, Germany. After a construction period of 21 months, the first phase of the factory opened, covering an area of 36,000 m². Total investment was around €120 million. The second phase was officially opened in 2008.

Profile

Osram Opto Semiconductors claims to be the world’s second largest manufacturer of optoelectronic semiconductors for the illumination; sensing, and visualization sectors. At its headquarters in Regensburg, Germany, further production sites in Penang and Kulim (Malaysia), and Wuxi (China), and a global network of sales and marketing centers, the company employs more than 6,000 people. In the fiscal year 2010, the optoelectronic semiconductor business activity accounts for twenty percent of overall Osram GmbH sales.

The semiconductor products of Osram Opto Semiconductors include visible-light LEDs; high-performance infrared LEDs; optoelectronic detectors, and semiconductor lasers. All the components are sold in various output categories with different brightness levels; sizes, and package formats. 

In 2009, the company presented "Orbeos", which they described as the first OLED light source for premium quality functional lighting.

Products

• Illumination
LEDs from OSRAM have been used in the automotive sector for a number of years. In this sector the company sells light sources for everything from dashboard lighting through headlights. The OSTAR platform, Osram's most powerful LED solution so far, includes high-power LEDs for numerous applications including lighting; projection; rear projection television (RPTV), and as IR light sources for the security sector.

• Visualization
Monochrome LEDs are used as points of light on information panels. Multicolor LEDs such as MultiLED cover the entire color triangle and are used in large-format displays at rock concerts, sports stadiums and trade fairs. The range of applications for LEDs includes screens of all sizes from small (for example for satnav systems, LCD monitors, mobile phones and other mobile terminals) to very large (102“ diagonal and higher). Small displays are also available with OLED backlighting. For projection applications the company will be using laser technology in addition to LEDs.

In December 2010, scientists at Osram Opto Semiconductors received the "Beckurts Prize" for their work on direct green semiconductor laser, one use for which is ultra-compact mobile RGB laser projectors.

Osram Opto Semiconductors provides support for their products, including customer-specific LED colors ("Color on Demand"); intelligent sensor modules, and brand-specific headlight designs.

• LEDs (Light Emitting Diodes)
SMD and through-hole packages in all visible colors

• Silicon Photodetectors
Phototransistors, PIN Photodiodes, Photo IC

• Optical Sensors
SMT Reflective Sensors and Slotted Interrupters

• Infrared Emitters
850 nm, 880 nm, 940 nm and 950 nm wavelength

• High-Power Laser Diodes
Single emitters, laser bars and laser stacks

References

Companies based in Regensburg
Light-emitting diode manufacturers
German brands
Sensor manufacturers